The 2004 Columbia Lions football team was an American football team that represented Columbia University during the 2004 NCAA Division I-AA football season. Columbia tied for last in the Ivy League. 

In their second season under head coach Bob Shoop, the Lions compiled a 1–9 record and were outscored 265 to 140. Rashad Biggers, Chuck Britton, Jeff Otis and Michael Quarshie were the team captains.  

The Lions' 1–6 conference record tied for seventh place in the Ivy League standings. Columbia was outscored 171 to 99 by Ivy opponents.  Columbia's only win was against fellow cellar-dweller Dartmouth.

Columbia played its homes games at Lawrence A. Wien Stadium in Upper Manhattan, in New York City.

Schedule

References

Columbia
Columbia Lions football seasons
Columbia Lions football